Offshoots are lateral shoots that are produced on the main stem of a plant. They may be known colloquially as "suckers". Also see basal shoot.

See also
 Stolon or runners

Plant anatomy
Plant morphology